Kalishankar or Kalisankar  is a bilingual action drama film in Odia and Bengali language by director Prashanta Nanda in 2007. Kalishankar is quite similar to old Manmohan Desai films wherein brothers separated in childhood grow up to find themselves on two sides of the fence. Then, when they recognise their blood link through a birthmark or a talisman, they join forces to fight the enemy together. Kalishankar is a story of a pair of grandchildren and their grandfather's revenge on their wrongdoers. The film has much stick-wielding action.

Plot
Kali, Shankar and Tithi are the three motherless children of the acting priest of a local Krishna temple in an anonymous small town/village in West Bengal or Odisha (differing between the language versions). The local MLA Debu Soren’s henchmen kill their father because he insists on standing witness in court against a murder committed at Soren’s behest. Kali, the elder brother, kills the corrupt lawyer as he walks out of the courtroom after the judge has delivered his judgement. Kali goes to jail for ten years. Shankar meets with a freak accident and is brought up by a local Muslim fakir. But the accident has left him with a memory loss and a penchant for violence. He grows up to be one of Debu Soren’s favourite henchmen. The little girl Tithi, who is picked off the streets by the maid of Debu’s mistress, grows up to become a wayward girl on the verge of turning alcoholic.

After ten long years, Kali is released. He returns to the temple to meet his grandfather who was away when Kali’s father was killed. The grandfather, a temple priest, encourages the grandson to avenge his father’s death. Kali, Shankar and Tithi are united and from then on, it is one long chain networking of fighting, blood and gore and the killing of the criminals one after the other in the same way their father was killed - by electric shock. The two young men come home to roost and it is one big happy family in the temple with their two girlfriends pitching in and Tithi hoping to tie the knot with the handsome young police officer.

Odia film
Kali Shankar is the Oriya film version starring Siddhanta Mahapatra, Anu Chowdhury, Anubhav Mohanty, Arindam Roy, Meghna Mishra and Ashish Vidyarthi.

Cast
Siddhanta Mahapatra as Kali
Anu Chowdhury
Anubhav Mohanty as Shankar
Arindam Roy as police officer
Meghna Mishra as Tithi
Mihir Das as priest
Bijay Mohanty as grandfather
Ashish Vidyarthi as MP Debu Soren

Music
 "Chota Chota"
 "De Daru"
 "Jhip Jhip Barsa"
 "Megha Bijuli"
 "Rati Helani"

Bengali film

Kalishankar is a 2007 Indian Bengali Language film starring Prosenjit Chatterjee, Anu Chowdhury, Anubhav Mohanty, Jisshu Sengupta, Ashish Vidyarthi, Sagarika, Swastika Mukherjee and Victor Banerjee.  Shoma A. Chatterji of www.screenindia.com commented that this movie is Manmohan Desai wine in Bengali bottle.

Cast
Prosenjit Chatterjee as Kali
Anubhav Mohanty as Shankar, Kali's younger brother
Ashish Vidyarthi as A corrupt politician, MP Debu Soren
Anu Chowdhury as Shreya, Kali's love interest
Swastika Mukherjee as Jhimli, Shankar's love interest
Jisshu Sengupta as SP Bikram
Victor Banerjee as Grandfather of Kali and Shankar
Sagarika as Tithi
Laboni Sarkar as Maya (Guest Appearance)
Rajatava Dutta as Gittu Hotelwala
 Biswanath Basu as Bala Brahmachari
Kaushik Banerjee as Police Commissioner
Shankar Chakraborty as Priest Beni Madhav, Kali & Shankar's father
 Sumit Ganguly as  Debu Soren's henchman
 Debesh Roy Chowdhury as Jayanta Das, lawyer

References

External links
 

Bengali-language Indian films
2007 films
2000s Bengali-language films
Indian multilingual films
Odia remakes of Hindi films
Bengali remakes of Hindi films
2000s Odia-language films
Films directed by Prashanta Nanda